NLF may stand for:
 National Liberation Front (disambiguation)
Viet Cong
 National Labour Federation (Pakistan)
 National Liberal Federation, organization of the British Liberal Party, 1877–1936
 National Labor Federation in Eretz-Israel, a national trade union center in Israel
 Natural laminar flow, an airfoil characteristic researched by Michimasa Fujino
 New Life Fellowship Church (Vietnam)
 Non-lactose fermenter, a type of bacterium that grows in Sorbitol-MacConkey agar
 Nuclear Liabilities Fund, a UK body funding nuclear decommissioning
 Darnley Island Airport, IATA airport code "NLF"